Haplochromis petronius is a species of cichlid endemic to Lake George, Uganda.  This species can reach a length of  SL.

References

petronius
Fish described in 1973
Endemic freshwater fish of Uganda
Cichlid fish of Africa
Taxonomy articles created by Polbot